Dorothy Catherine Anstett (born June 28, 1947) is an American pageant titleholder who held the Miss USA 1968 title.

Anstett competed in the Miss Washington pageant in July 1967 and placed first runner-up. In April of the following year she won the Miss Washington USA 1968 crown title. She won the Miss USA 1968 title on May 18, 1968, and represented the United States at Miss Universe 1968 in July, where she placed fourth runner-up.

Anstett, one of nine children of an aircraft plant worker, was an English major at the University of Washington at the time of her win. She was married to legendary basketball player Bill Russell in 1977. They divorced in 1980.

References

External links

Miss USA official website

1947 births
American beauty pageant winners
Living people
Miss Universe 1968 contestants
Miss USA 1960s delegates
Miss USA winners
People from Kirkland, Washington
University of Washington College of Arts and Sciences alumni
Miss Washington USA winners
20th-century American people